Major General Christopher John Ghika  is a senior British Army officer who was the deputy commander of the US-led military coalition against ISIS, the Combined Joined Task Force-Operation Inherent Resolve, until 2019.

Early life

Ghika is the son of Brigadier Prince John Ghika, an Irish Guards officer who traced his royal title back to 1658, when the Romanian Ghica dynasty ruled over Moldavia and later Wallachia. Chris Ghika does not use the title "Prince" publicly. He was educated at Ampleforth College.

Military career 

Ghika was commissioned into the Irish Guards in 1993, upon completing the commissioning course at the Royal Military Academy, Sandhurst. After various field and staff  roles, he  became commanding officer of the 1st Battalion, Irish Guards, in 2010. He was deployed as the head of a battlegroup, as a Lieutenant Colonel, to Helmand Province, Afghanistan. He later went on to be Deputy Commander of the 1st (US) Infantry Division in 2014, Head of Personnel Capability in the Army Headquarters in September 2015, and Deputy Commander Strategy and Information of Combined Joined Task Force-Operation Inherent Resolve in 2018.

He was appointed Major-General commanding the Household Division on 15 November 2019. In June 2020, during the coronavirus pandemic, he was responsible for the modified Trooping the Colour ceremony at Windsor Castle. He was appointed the commanding officer of the procession to Westminster Hall and the subsequent funeral of Queen Elizabeth II.

Ghika became Regimental Lieutenant Colonel of the Irish Guards on 10 June 2022.

References 

 

British Army major generals
British people of Romanian descent
Operation Inherent Resolve
British Army personnel of the War in Afghanistan (2001–2021)
Commanders of the Order of the British Empire
Romanian nobility
Romanian princes
Irish Guards officers
People educated at Ampleforth College